Mohan Padmanabhan is an Indian economist and journalist. He writes for a number of major financial newspapers including The Hindu Business Line.

In the 1990s he was Deputy Chief of the News Bureau of the newspaper The Hindu Business Line. He is based in Kolkata.

References

Living people
Year of birth missing (living people)
Writers from Kolkata
The Hindu journalists
Indian business and financial journalists
Journalists from West Bengal
Indian male journalists